Matthias Weischer (born 1973 in Elte, North Rhine-Westphalia, West Germany) is a painter living in Leipzig. Weischer is considered to be part of the New Leipzig School.

Life 
Matthias Weischer studied painting from 1995 to 2001 and received his MA in 2003 from Hochschule für Grafik und Buchkunst (HGB) in Leipzig. He was a student in the master class of Professor Sighard Gille. In 2002, he was a co-founder of the artist-initiated gallery LIGA in Berlin that was run by eleven former HGB students, among them Christoph Ruckhäberle, Tim Eitel, David Schnell and Tilo Baumgärtel. LIGA was closed after two years in 2004. After cooperating with Galerie Kleindienst (Leipzig), Anthony Wilkinson (London) and EIGEN + Art (Leipzig/Berlin) Weischer is currently represented by König Gallery (Berlin) and Grimm Gallery (Amsterdam). His studio is located at the Leipzig Cotton Mill.

Work 
Weischers works oscillate between abstract and figurative painting. Until 2006, his paintings depicted deserted interiors like stage settings that are infused with abstract elements. Furniture, everyday objects, and large-scale ornaments stylistically refer to the 1950s and 1960s. In their collage-like appearance, they establish a complex and ambiguous relationship.

During his residency in Rome in 2007, Weischer concentrated on drawing and studies on nature and landscape. Since then, he predominantly works on and with paper, in smaller formats and with a lighter range of colors. He also explores different printing techniques and, recently, three-dimensional sculptural arrangements.

Since 2001, his work has been exhibited worldwide, e.g. in London (2003), Miami (2004), at the Venice Biennale, the Cleveland Museum of Art, in Chungnam, Korea (2005), The Hague, Málaga (2008), Ponce, Puerto Rico (2011), Hong Kong (2015) and Amsterdam (2017).

Among the public and private collections holding works by Matthias Weischer are the Museum of Contemporary Art, Los Angeles, Gemeentemuseum Den Haag, The Hague, Arken Museum of Modern Art, Denmark, Arario Collection, Corea, Museum der bildenden Künste, Leipzig, Rubel Family Collection, Miami and Susan and Michael Hort, New York.

Solo exhibitions 
 2020: Bühne, Drents Museum, Assen, Netherlands 
 2020: Matthias Weischer, König Tokio Gallery, Tokyo 
 2020: Stage, Grimm Gallery, New York 
 2019: Matthias Weischer, König Gallery, Berlin 
 2017: Bankett, Grimm Gallery, Amsterdam
 2016: In und auf Papier, Kloster Bentlage, Rheine
 2016: Matthias Weischer - Grafik von 2005-2016, Thaler Originalgrafik, Leipzig
 2015: Matthias Weischer, König Gallery, Berlin
 2015: traces to nowhere, Lehmann Maupin Gallery, Hong Kong
 2015: Matthias Weischer: Das druckgraphische Werk, Akademie Franz-Hitz-Haus, Münster
 2014: Matthias Weischer, TAJAN, Paris
 2014: The Vincent Award Room: Matthias Weischer., Gemeentemuseum Den Haag
 2013: Thicket, GRIMM Gallery, Amsterdam
 2011: Obra nueva/New works, Museo de Arte de Ponce, Puerto Rico
 2011: Alice, Armin und all die anderen. Auf Papier, Museum der bildenden Künste Leipzig; Kunstverein Bremerhaven
 2010: In Monte Carlo, Galerie EIGEN + ART, Leipzig
 2009: Room with a view, Kunsthalle Mainz
 2008: Room with a view, CAC Málaga - Centro de Arte Contemporáneo de Málaga
 2008: Der Garten – Arbeiten auf Papier, Kloster Bentlage, Rheine
 2008: Gemeentemuseum Den Haag
 2007: Museum zu Allerheiligen Schaffhausen; Kunsthalle Mannheim
 2007: Der Garten – Arbeiten auf Papier, Neuer Berliner Kunstverein
 2006: Arbeiten auf Papier, Kunstverein Konstanz; Kunstverein Ulm
 2006: Galerie EIGEN + ART, Berlin
 2006: Ludwig Forum für Internationale Kunst, Aachen
 2005: Museum der bildenden Künste Leipzig (Art award of the Leipziger Volkszeitung)
 2004: simultan, Künstlerhaus Bremen
 2003: 3 Zimmer, Diele, Bad, LIGA, Berlin
 2003: Anthony Wilkinson Gallery, London
 2002: Räumen, Kunsthaus Essen
 2001: Galerie Kleindienst, Leipzig

Selected group exhibitions 

 2019: Away in the Hill, Grimm Gallery, New York 
 2017: Germany 8: Next Generation - Young German Art, White Box Art Center, Peking
 2017: Three Positions. Six Directions, König Gallery, Berlin
 2017: Künstlerräume II, Gallery Karsten Greve, Cologne
 2016: Aufschlussreiche Räume - Interieur als Portrait, Museum Morsbroich, Leverkusen
 2016: "Maroc", ASPN Gallery, Leipzig
 2015: Made in Germany, Highpoint Printmaking Center, Minneapolis
 2015: Camera Obscura - Malerei von David Schnell, Matthias Weischer und Christoph Ruckhäberle, Neuer Pfaffenhofener Kunstverein, Pfaffenhofen
 2015: Offen auf AEG: Druckgrafische Arbeiten Auf AEG, Nürnberg
 2015: All the worlds a stage - works from the Goetz Collection; Fundacion Banco Santander, Madrid
 2014: This side of Paradise, S|2 Sotheby's, London
 2013: Donation Florence et Daniel Guerlain, Centre Pompidou, Paris
 2013: Ortsbestimmung - Zeitgenössische Kunst aus Sachsen, Kulturhistorisches Museum Görlitz
 2013: Schöne Landschaft - Bedrohte Natur: Alte Meister im Dialog mit zeitgenössischer Kunst, Kunsthalle Osnabrück
 2013: The inevitable figuration, Centro per l'arte contemporanea Luigi Pecci, Prato
 2013: Nightfall, Rudolfinum, Prag* 2012: "Paintings/Pinturas. The Rubell Family Collection", Sala de Arte Santander, Madrid
 2012: "Atelier + Küche – Labore der Sinne", Marta Herford
 2012: "Sidetracks – Painting in the paramodern continuum", Stavanger Art Museum
 2010: "'Die Bilder tun was mit mir ...'. Einblicke in die Sammlung Frieder Burda", Museum Frieder Burda, Baden-Baden
 2010: "Parallels: Young contemporary painting from Norway/Leipzig", Kistefos Museum, Jevnaker
 2008: "Interieur/Exterieur. Wohnen in der Kunst", Kunstmuseum Wolfsburg
 2008: "New Leipzig School", Cobra Museum, Amstelveen
 2008: "The Leipzig Phenomenon", Műcsarnok Kunsthalle, Budapest
 2008: "Germania contemporanea. Dipingere è narrare", MART - Museo d'arte moderna e contemporanea di Trento e Rovereto
 2007: "Weischer meets Beckmann", Kunsthalle Mannheim
 2007: "Rockers Island. Werke aus der Sammlung Olbricht", Museum Folkwang Essen
 2006: "Imagination Becomes Reality. Part V: Fantasy and Fiction", Sammlung Goetz, Munich
 2006: "Artists from Leipzig", Arario Beijing
 2006: "Netherlands v. Germany - Painting/Malerei", GEM Museum voor actuele kunst, The Hague
 2006: "Deutsche Wandstücke. Sette scene di nuova pittura germanica", Museion Bozen
 2005: "The Triumph of Painting. Part 3", Saatchi Gallery, London
 2005: "51. Biennale di Venezia. The Experience of Art", Venice
 2005: "Cold Hearts. Artists from Leipzig", Arario Gallery, Cheonan, Korea
 2005: "David, Matthes und ich", Kunstverein Nürnberg; Kunstverein Bielefeld
 2004: "Life After Death. New Leipzig Paintings from the Rubell Family Collection", Rubell Family Collection, Miami; MASS MoCA, North Adams; SITE Santa Fe, New Mexico; Katzen Arts Center Museum, Washington D.C.; Frye Art Museum, Seattle; Salt Lake Art Center, Salt Lake City; Kemper Museum of Contemporary Art, Kansas City (bis 2008)
 2004: "Northern Light", Rubell Family Collection, Miami
 2003: "sieben mal malerei", Neuer Leipziger Kunstverein im Museum der bildenden Künste Leipzig
 2002: "6 aus 11", LIGA, Berlin
 2002: Galerie EIGEN + ART, Leipzig
 2001: Galerie Kleindienst, Leipzig
 2001: "Szenenwechsel XX", Museum für Moderne Kunst Frankfurt am Main
 2000: "lokal", Galerie EIGEN + ART, Leipzig
 2000: "LIGA", Steibs Hof, Leipzig

Awards 
 2017: Eduard Arnhold Scholarship
 2012: Scholarship Civitella Ranieri Foundation
 2007: Scholarship of the Deutsche Akademie Rom Villa Massimo, Rome
 2005: Art award of the Leipziger Volkszeitung
 2005: August Macke Prize
 2004: Protégé of Mentor David Hockney - Rolex Mentor and Protégé Arts Initiative
 2003: Scholarship Stiftung Kunstfonds zur Förderung der zeitgenössischen bildenden Kunst, Bonn
 2001: Scholarship Junge Kunst, Kunsthaus Essen

Publications 
 Michael Hametner: Auf der Bühne. 15 Gespräche – ein Porträt des Malers Matthias Weischer. Mitteldeutscher Verlag 2016. (German/Englisch) .
 Matthias Weischer. Obra nueva/New work, exh. cat. Museo de Arte de Ponce, Puerto Rico 2011. (Spanish/English) 
 Kunstwerkstatt Matthias Weischer, Prestel Verlag, Munich 2011. (German) 
 Matthias Weischer. Room with a view, exh. cat. Kunsthalle Mainz, Sparkasse Essen 2009. (German/English) 
 Matthias Weischer. In the Space Between, exh. cat. CAC Málaga 2008. (Spanish) 
 Matthias Weischer. Der Garten. Arbeiten auf Papier/The Garden. Works on Paper, exh. cat. Neuer Berliner Kunstverein; Kloster Bentlage, Rheine 2007. (German/English) 
 Matthias Weischer. Malerei/Painting, exh. cat. Museum zu Allerheiligen Schaffhausen, Kunsthalle Mannheim, Gemeentemuseum Den Haag 2007. (German/English) 
 The triumph of painting. Matthias Weischer, Eberhard Havekost, Dexter Dalwood, Dana Schutz, Michael Raedecker, Inka Essenhigh, London 2005. 
 Matthias Weischer. Simultan, exh. cat. Künstlerhaus Bremen 2004. (German/English)

References

External links
 Official website
 Matthias Weischer at König Gallery
 Matthias Weischer at GRIMM Gallery
 David Hockney and Matthias Weischer, Rolex Mentor and Protégé Arts Initiative 2004/05

1973 births
Living people
People from Rheine
20th-century German painters
20th-century German male artists
German male painters
21st-century German painters
21st-century German male artists
German contemporary artists
Hochschule für Grafik und Buchkunst Leipzig alumni
Artists from Leipzig